The U.S. Post Office, located at 65 W. Mill Ave., is the main post office in Porterville, California. Built from 1933 to 1937, the post office was designed by H. Rafael Lake in the Art Deco style. The design features decorative terra cotta plaques over the windows and cast aluminum plaques below the front windows, decorative features used in no other building in Porterville. A terra cotta frieze atop the front entry features eagle and acanthus motifs borrowed from Roman designs and a sunrise pattern typical of Art Deco decorations. The building is topped with a green tile roof, an unusual element in Art Deco buildings which is consistent with the vernacular Mission Revival style common in Porterville architecture. The post office is one of three Art Deco post offices remaining in California.

The post office was added to the National Register of Historic Places as US Post Office–Porterville Main on January 11, 1985.

See also 
List of United States post offices

References

External links 

Porterville
Art Deco architecture in California
Government buildings completed in 1937
Buildings and structures in Tulare County, California
National Register of Historic Places in Tulare County, California